Lewis County General Hospital (LCGH) is a Short Term Acute Care facility in Lowville, New York serving its eponymous county both for medical service and as its largest employer. LCGH is part of "Lewis County Health System".

History
Lewis County General Hospital opened in August 1931, and has periodically expanded. Local Law 2 of 1973, passed by the legislature of Lewis County provided for ambulance service.

In 2014 Lewis County General Hospital affiliated with St. Joseph's Health hospital network of Syracuse. 

In 2019 LCGH became part of the newly formed "Lewis County Health System". 

LCGH was one of 80 locations for a statewide drug-takeback program to collect old medications.

Lewis County Health System
Lewis County General Hospital is a Short Term Acute Care facility with a level II Emergency Department open twenty-four hours. The hospital shares the 14.5 acre main campus in Lowville with Lewis County Hospice and the Lewis County General Hospital Certified Home Health Agency (CHHA) and the 160 bed Nursing Home Unit. LCHS has family practice clinics in Beaver Falls, Copenhagen, and South Lewis.

In April 2020, due to the Covid epidemic, elective surgeries were curtailed. That and the decrease in ancillary visits and people visiting their doctors led to a drop in revenue that necessitated the furlough of about 14% of hospital staff. The cuts did not effect the hospice program or nursing home. 

In September 2021, Lewis County General Hospital paused its maternity services due to staff shortages, attributed in part to the Covid epidemic. The hospital is actively recruiting and hopes to resume the service in spring 2023. In the interim, pre-natal care is provided at the Women's Health Clinic. Under a Memorandum of Understanding mothers-to-be in final weeks of pregnancy transition to care through Samaritan Medical Center in Watertown. Similar agreements were reached with Carthage Area Hospital and the Mohawk Valley Health System in Utica.

In April 2022, Lewis County Health System broke ground on a new two-story surgical pavilion. The project will also include the renovation of medical, surgical and ICU units at the hospital.

References

  

Hospitals in New York (state)